Gødstrup station is a railway station serving the Gødstrup regional hospital in the village of Gødstrup in Jutland, Denmark. The station is located about 200 m from the hospital's main entrance.

Gødstrup station is located on the Vejle-Holstebro railway line. The station originally opened in 1904 with the opening of the Herning-Holstebro section of the Vejle-Holstebro railway line, and was closed in 1969. It was reopened in 2021 to serve the new Gødstrup regional hospital, which opened in 2022. The stations offers direct InterCityLyn services to Copenhagen and Struer operated by the railway company DSB as well as regional train services to Fredericia, Aarhus and Struer operated by Arriva.

History
The station originally opened on 11 October 1904 with the opening of the Herning-Holstebro section of the Vejle-Holstebro railway line, and was closed in 1969. The station was reopened on 15 March 2021 to serve the new Gødstrup regional hospital, which opened on 13. februar 2022. The reopened station is located approximately 300 meters from the original Gødstrup Station.

Operations
The stations offers direct InterCityLyn services to Copenhagen and Struer operated by the railway company DSB as well as regional train services to Fredericia, Aarhus and Struer operated by Arriva. All passenger trains in both directions stop at the station with two stops per hour each way during the day and one per hour in the evening hours.

Architecture
The original station building from 1904 was designed by the Danish architect Heinrich Wenck (1851–1936), known for the numerous railway stations he designed across Denmark in his capacity of head architect of the Danish State Railways. The station building was sold when the station closed in 1969, and still exists as a private residence.

Facilities
The station has a forecourt with bicycle and car parking as well as a bus and taxi stand. In addition, a kiss-and-ride zone has been established with options for disembarking and boarding.

See also
 List of railway stations in Denmark

References

Citations

Bibliography

External links
 Banedanmark – government agency responsible for maintenance and traffic control of most of the Danish railway network
 DSB – largest Danish train operating company
 Arriva – British multinational public transport company operating bus and train services in Denmark
 Danske Jernbaner – website with information on railway history in Denmark

Railway stations opened in 1904
Railway stations closed in 1969
Railway stations in the Central Denmark Region
Railway stations in Denmark opened in 2021
Heinrich Wenck railway stations
Railway stations in Denmark opened in the 20th century

Railway stations in Denmark opened in the 21st century